Robert McMillan  (born 1857) was a Welsh international footballer. He was part of the Wales national football team, playing 2 matches. He played his first match on 26 February 1881 against England and his last match on 14 March 1881 against Scotland.

At Club level he played for Shrewsbury Engineers.

See also
 List of Wales international footballers (alphabetical)
 List of Wales international footballers born outside Wales

References

1857 births
Welsh footballers
Wales international footballers
Place of birth missing
Year of death missing
Association footballers not categorized by position